Drysdale is a Scottish familial lineage belonging to the Douglas clan, and may refer to:

People
 Adelina Munro Drysdale (1896–1942), Argentine socialite
 Anne Drysdale (1792–1853), Scottish settler in Australia
 Art Drysdale (born 1939), Canadian celebrity gardener
 Brian Drysdale (born 1943), English footballer
 Cliff Drysdale (born 1941), former professional tennis player and current tennis announcer
 Denise Drysdale (born 1947), Australian entertainer
 Don Drysdale (1936–1993), pitcher for the Los Angeles Dodgers, member of the Baseball Hall of Fame
 Dougal Drysdale, Professor Emeritus in Fire Safety Engineering at The University of Edinburgh
 Douglas Drysdale (1915–1984), Scottish nationalist
 Jamie Drysdale (born 2002), Canadian ice hockey player
 Jason Drysdale (born 1970), English footballer
 John Drysdale (disambiguation)
 Kathryn Drysdale (born 1981), English actress
 Kirsten Drysdale (born 1984), Australian television presenter and journalist
 Learmont Drysdale (1866–1909), Scottish composer
 Mahé Drysdale (born 1978), New Zealand rower
 Peter Drysdale (born 1938), Australian academic, Emeritus Professor of Economics and Visiting Fellow at The Australian National University
 Pippin Drysdale (born 1943), Australian ceramicist and art instructor, Australia's highest earning ceramic artist 
 Robert Drysdale, Brazilian jiu-jitsu black belt and retired professional mixed martial arts
 Russell Drysdale (1912–1981), Australian artist
 Sydney Drysdale, English lawn bowler
 William Drysdale (1876–1916), Scottish cricketer and soldier

Fictional characters
 Milburn Drysdale, from the American television series The Beverly Hillbillies